The Feathered Serpent  is a 1934 British thriller film directed by Maclean Rogers and starring Enid Stamp-Taylor, Tom Helmore and Moore Marriott. A reporter faces a race against time to clear an actress accused of murder. It is based on the 1927 novel The Feathered Serpent by Edgar Wallace.

Cast
 Enid Stamp-Taylor ...  Ella Crewe
 Tom Helmore ...  Peter Dewin
 D. A. Clarke-Smith ...  Joe Farmer
 Moore Marriott ...  Harry Hugg
 Molly Fisher ...  Daphne Olroyd
 Vincent Holman ...  Inspector Clarke
 Evelyn Roberts ...  Leicester Crewe
 Iris Baker ...  Paula Ricks
 O. B. Clarence ...  George Beale

References

External links

1934 films
1930s crime thriller films
Films based on works by Edgar Wallace
Films directed by Maclean Rogers
British black-and-white films
British crime thriller films
1930s British films